The 2015–16 season was the 90th season in the history of the French association football club Chamois Niortais. The senior team competed in Ligue 2 for the fourth consecutive season following an 11th-placed finish in 2014–15. The club also competed in both the Coupe de France and the Coupe de la Ligue.

Niort achieved a 16th-place finish in Ligue 2, reached the tenth round of the Coupe de France, and the first round of the Coupe de la Ligue.

Competitions

Ligue 2

League table

Results summary

Matches

Coupe de France

Niort entered the Coupe de France in the seventh round along with the other Ligue 2 clubs. For their opening fixture of the 2015–16 edition of the competition, Niort were drawn away at sixth-tier club La Rochelle. The team progressed to the next stage with a 5–1 victory which included a brace from Seydou Koné and a first-half goal by debutant Quentin Daubin.

Matches

Coupe de la Ligue

Niort, aiming to progress past the first round of the Coupe de la Ligue for the first time since 2012, were handed an away tie at Sochaux in their opening game. Despite goals from Omrani and Koné, the home team—reduced to nine men in the second half—triumphed by three goals to two.

Matches

Appearances and goals
.

References

External links
 Chamois Niortais F.C. official website

Chamois Niortais F.C. seasons
Chamois Niortais